Mount Pueh (Malay: Gunung Pueh), also known as Mount Pueh-Berumput, Mount Poi and Mount Poe, is a mountain located near Lundu, Sarawak on the Malaysia-Indonesia border. Mount Pueh was known to biologists for the collections made there by Eric Mjöberg (1882–1938), a Swedish naturalist, who was Curator of the Sarawak Museum between 1922–1924.  Mjöberg's herpetological collections from Gunung Pueh between October to December 1923, and other localities in Borneo, were reported by Smith (1925). Mjöberg, unfortunately, left little by way of written records, of his ascent of Pueh and the collections he made.

In 2002, an exploration was organised to find out about the area. During a scientific expedition to the summit of Mount Berumput on 6–14 May 2002, 26 species of birds, four species of bats and one species of rat were observed. The only montane endemic recorded in this expedition is the grey fruit bat, Aethalops alecto. Based on their tracks and other signs, wild pigs (Sus barbatus) were common near the summit. Three arcuate horseshoe bats (Rhinolophus arcuatus), previously recorded only from Bungoh cave near Bau in Sarawak.

In 2012, dragonfly species on the mountain were surveyed. A collection was made of 67 species of dragonfly. This included Libellago stigmatizans and Copera ciliata which had not been previously recorded in the area.

References

Further reading
 Banks, E. 1952. Mammals and birds from the Maga Mountains in Borneo. Bulletin of the Raffles Museum 24: 160–163.
 Inger, R F. 1966. The systematics and zoogeography of the Amphibia of Borneo. Fieldiana Zoology, 52:1–402. Note: Reprinted 1990, Lun Hing Trading Company, Kota Kinabalu and 2005, Natural History Publications (Borneo) Sdn. Bhd., Kota Kinabalu.
 Lord Medway. 1977. Mammals of Borneo. Field keys and an annotated checklist. Monographs of the Malaysian Branch of the Royal Asiatic Society No. 7. Kuala Lumpur. xii + 172 pp.
 MacKinnon, K., Hatta, G., Halim, H. and Mangalik, A. 1996. The Ecology of Kalimantan. Periplus Edition (HK) Ltd.
 Mjöberg E. 1930. Forest life and adventures in the Malay Archipelago. George Allen and Unwin Ltd., London. 201 pp., 83 pl., 1 folding map. Note: Reprinted 1999, Natural History Publications (Borneo) Sdn Bhd., Kota Kinabalu. Original Swedish edition published in 1928, entitled, 'I tropikernas villande urskogar', Natur & Kultur, Stockholm. 212 pp + index + map.
 Mohd-Azlan, J., Neuchlos, J. and M.T. Abdullah. 2005. Diversity of Chiropterans in limestone forest area, Bau, Sarawak. Malaysian Applied Biology. 34(1): 59–64.
 Payne, J., Francis, C.M. and Phillipps, K. 2005. A Field Guide to Mammals of Borneo. The Sabah Society with WWF Malaysia, Kota Kinabalu.
 Smith M A 1925. Contribution to the herpetology of Borneo. Sarawak Museum Journal 3(8): 15–34.
 Smythies, B.E. 1999. Birds of Borneo, 4th edition revised by G.W.H. Davidson. Natural History Publications (Borneo) Sdn. Bhd.
 Tuen, A.A., Osman, A. and Putet, C. 2000. Distribution and abundance of small mammals and birds at Mt. Santubong, Sarawak. Sarawak Museum Journal. 76: 235–254.
 Tuen, A.A., Abdullah, M.T., Rahman, M.A., Laman, C.J., Abang Aimran, A.A., Mawek, Z and Tambi Lee, E. Small mammals and birds of Pueh, Sarawak. Paper presented at Unimas Research Colloquium 2005.

Pueh
Pueh
Pueh